Trujillo Marinera Festival is a Peruvian cultural event held annually in Trujillo city in January. The event focuses on a dance contest called the marinera, a typical dance of the city and of the country. The festival also presents parades, presentations and competitions of Peruvian paso horses. Both the marinera dance and the Peruvian paso horse have been declared to be part of the cultural heritage of the nation by the Peruvian government. This festival is one of the most important cultural events and representative of the country and Trujillo city has been recognized by the Peruvian government as the National Capital Marinera by Law Number 24447, of January 24, 1986.

Description

Trujillo is home to the marinera national competition each year. It is a typical dance of the city, organized by the Trujillo Club Libertad and it is performed in the last week of January. Many dance partners from different parts of the country and foreign guests come to the contest every year to compete in the categories of the competition that draws thousands of tourists from around the world. It also highlights the corso through the main streets of the Historic Centre that ends in main Square of Trujillo and the presentation of the typical Peruvian paso in the city. The festival begins with the presentation of the Queen that represents this Marinera Festival then it happen several cultural events for the public attending the festival.

Events

Marinera contest 
The National Marinera Contest is held every year during the month of January, in the city of Trujillo. Are presented pairs of dancers from around the country competing in different categories. Dances are entertained by bands of musicians in the city.

Parade 
It takes place in the streets of the Historic Centre of Trujillo. The dancers and queens participate in this parade with cars decorated with things for the festival, the parade ends in the Plaza de Armas of Trujillo with dances of marinera.

Characters of the festival
The principal characters are:

Queen of Marinera she is the queen of the festival.
Dance Champions, the best dancers of the before edition and some invited dancers.
Dancers, they compete for categories.
Bands of musicians, they animate the dances for the competitions.

Peruvian paso in festival
During Trujillo marinera festival in January of every year there is also peruvian paso contest. Trujillo is known and considered as the Cradle of the typical Peruvian Paso Horse as well as the Capital of Culture of Peru so as the Capital of the Marinera dance, which is one of the most important cultural events in the country.

Gallery

Queens of Marinera festival
Some of the queens of Marinera Festival are the following:

Winners of marinera dance
Some of the winners of Marinera Festival are the following:

See also
 Trujillo Spring Festival
 San Jose Festival
 Trujillo Book Festival
 International Festival of Lyric Singing
 Trujillo
 Santiago de Huamán
 Victor Larco Herrera District
 Guillermo Ganoza Vargas

Media

References

External links

 Map of Trujillo, the city of this Marinera festival

Festivals in Trujillo, Peru
Folk festivals in Peru